Hajji Bachcheh (also Romanized as Ḩājjī Bachcheh and Ḩājī Bachcheh; also known as Hājibacheh) is a village in Qoltuq Rural District, in the Central District of Zanjan County, Zanjan Province, Iran. At the 2006 census, its population was 136, in 31 families.

References 

Populated places in Zanjan County